InterCourses: An Aphrodisiac Cookbook is a 1997 cookbook written by Martha Hopkins and Randall Lockridge with photography by Ben Fink, and published by Terrace Publishing.

It focuses primarily on recipes and foods appropriate for romantic settings and seduction, covering traditionally sexually-associated foods such as chocolate, strawberries, oysters, honey, and avocados, as well as less-traditional foods such as pine nuts, coffee, and chiles. The recipes are illustrated with numerous personal stories interviewed for each edition and extensive, non-explicit erotic photography.

According to the book's official website, the book was followed by a substantially revised and expanded edition entitled The New InterCourses, which was released in 2007 for the 10th anniversary of the book. Both books have received extensive media coverage, including the New York Times, TV Food Network, CNN, Splendid Table, Los Angeles Times, and many others. In total, InterCourses has sold more than 325,000 copies, as well as foreign rights to England and Australia.

References

External links

Cookbooks
1997 non-fiction books
English-language books